The Seal of the Federated States of Micronesia resembles the previous seal of the Trust Territory of the Pacific Islands, and reads "Government of the Federated States of Micronesia". The seal had been adopted by the Congress of the Federated States of Micronesia and then accepted by the United States Congress.

External links
Information on national symbols of FSM

National symbols of the Federated States of Micronesia
Federated States of Micronesia
Micronesia, Federated States
Micronesia, Federated States
Micronesia, Federated States